Sam Tecklenburg (born January 31, 1997) is an American football center for the Carolina Panthers of the National Football League (NFL). He played college football at Baylor.

Professional career
After playing four years at Baylor, Tecklenburg was signed by the Carolina Panthers as an undrafted free agent on April 27, 2020. Tecklenburg was reunited with Carolina Panthers head coach Matt Rhule, who was also his head coach at Baylor. He was waived during final roster cuts on September 5, and signed to the practice squad the next day. He was promoted to the active roster on October 20, 2020. He was waived on November 5 and re-signed to the practice squad two days later. He signed a reserve/future contract with the Panthers on January 4, 2021.

On August 31, 2021, Tecklenburg was waived by the Panthers and re-signed to the practice squad the next day. He was promoted to the active roster on September 7, 2021.

On August 30, 2022, Tecklenburg was waived by the Panthers and signed to the practice squad the next day. He was promoted to the active roster on January 7, 2023.

References

External links
Baylor Bears bio
Carolina Panthers bio

1997 births
Living people
American football centers
Baylor Bears football players
Carolina Panthers players
Sportspeople from Plano, Texas
Players of American football from Texas